Sarries may refer to:

 Saracens F.C., a rugby club in London, England 
 Part of the Sarriés – Sartze municipality in Navarre, Spain